Isabelle Arsenault (born 1978) is a Canadian award winning illustrator living in Montreal, Quebec. She is known for her elaborate yet simplified artwork in children's literature.

Biography

Arsenault was born in Sept-Îles, Quebec. She received a bachelor's degree in graphic design from the Université du Québec à Montréal. After completing her studies, she specialized in illustration. Arsenault has won awards from competitions sponsored by Communication Arts, American Illustration and Applied Arts.

In 2005, she won the Governor General's Award for French-language children's illustration for Le Coeur de Monsieur Gauguin; the text was by Marie-Danielle Croteau. Migrant, illustrated by Arsenault, was named to the New York Times' list for 2011. In 2012, she won the Governor General's Award for English-language children's illustration for Virginia Wolf; Kyo Maclear provided the text. Additionally, in 2020 IBBY Canada nominated Isabelle Arsenault with the Hans Christian Andersen Award. Her accomplishments towards the ongoing expansion of children's literature were noteworthy enough to consider her for nomination.

Early life

Childhood 
Born in Sept-Îles, Quebec, Arsenault and her family moved to Île-Bizard and lived there much of her adolescent life. As a child Arsenault took part in a contest for illustration, that her local newspaper was holding at the time for Christmas. It was at this stage in her life that she had realized her passion for artistic endeavors, and this was made more apparent by her winning the contest. She notes "I understood that I really enjoyed drawing, and I could use my ability to create something unique".

Art Education 
Arsenault spent many of her childhood years never going to art schools, as she was not aware that art was to become her future profession. However, she did take various arts studies within her Secondary school education. It was through her various art classes that teachers inspired her. She claims she would spend hours at a time on art through various mediums outside of her classroom.

Approach to illustrations

Visual Style 
Arsenault's art style is often described as minimalist in nature, and for the most part very colorful. Instead of opting for hard lines and detailed backgrounds and characters, she often illustrates with an ease of hand, but conveys emotion through these simple images and their text. Much of Arsenault's art attempts to evoke emotions in the reader, with more interest in showcasing the character's state of mind, and less the external causes for their state of mind. In her seminal work for Maxine Trottier's Migrant we see this at work, as much of the environment is less focused upon; when in contrast the young Mennonite farmer's child envisions herself and others visually as jackrabbits and kittens.

Planning 

Arsenault attributes her style to doodling early drafts as rough as possible, so to understand the overall visual story she wishes to produce. Arsenault explains in her blog that it grants her a level of freedom that allows for her emotions at the time of finalization to be expressed through her art. Much of her style is derived from her experimental improvisational approach, filled with potential mistakes.

Publication

References

External links
Official website

1978 births
Living people
Governor General's Award-winning children's illustrators
Canadian comics artists
Canadian female comics artists
Université du Québec à Montréal alumni
Artists from Quebec
Canadian women artists
People from Sept-Îles, Quebec